Bristow is a ghost town in Independence Township, Osborne County, Kansas, United States.

History
Emley was issued a post office in 1872. The post office was renamed Bristow in 1876, then discontinued in 1901.  There is nothing left of Bristow.

References

Former populated places in Osborne County, Kansas
Former populated places in Kansas